Final league standings for the 1917-18 St. Louis Soccer League.

League standings

External links
St. Louis Soccer Leagues (RSSSF)
The Year in American Soccer - 1918

1917-18
1917–18 domestic association football leagues
1917–18 in American soccer
St Louis Soccer
St Louis Soccer